The 2007 MSBL season was the 19th season of the Men's State Basketball League (SBL). The regular season began on Friday 30 March and ended on Saturday 4 August. The finals began on Saturday 11 August and ended on Saturday 8 September, when the Goldfields Giants defeated the Lakeside Lightning in the MSBL Grand Final.

Regular season
The regular season began on Friday 30 March and ended on Saturday 4 August after 18 rounds of competition.

Standings

Finals
The finals began on Saturday 11 August and ended on Saturday 8 September with the MSBL Grand Final.

Bracket

Awards

Statistics leaders

Regular season
 Most Valuable Player: Aaron Shaw (Lakeide Lightning)
 Coach of the Year: Andy Stewart (Lakeside Lightning)
 Most Improved Player: Joel Wagner (Perth Redbacks)
 All Star First Team:
 Michael Lay (Geraldton Buccaneers)
 Aaron Shaw (Lakeide Lightning)
 Jason Harris (Geraldton Buccaneers)
 Robert Epps (Willetton Tigers)
 Ty Shaw (Goldfields Giants)
 All Star Second Team:
 Shamus Ballantyne (Goldfields Giants)
 Ben Hunt (Willetton Tigers)
 Jeff Dowdell (Wanneroo Wolves)
 Jarrad Prue (Lakeside Lightning)
 Sean Sonderleiter (Perry Lakes Hawks)
 All Star Third Team:
 Joel Wagner (Perth Redbacks)
 Chris Stephens (Rockingham Flames)
 Charleston Long (Lakeside Lightning)
 Kyle Kunkel (Stirling Senators)
 Damian Matacz (Wanneroo Wolves)

Finals
 Grand Final MVP: Shamus Ballantyne (Goldfields Giants)

References

External links
 2007 SBL season at sbl.asn.au
 2007 fixtures
 2007 finals schedule
 2007 quarter-finals wrap and semi-finals schedule
 

2007
2006–07 in Australian basketball
2007–08 in Australian basketball